Sir Benjamin Julian Alfred Slade, 7th Baronet (born 22 May 1946) is a businessman and self-publicist. His current partner is Rebekah Seddon-Wickens.

Life 
Sir Benjamin Julian Alfred Slade was the son of Sir Michael Nial Slade, 6th Baronet, and Angela Clare Rosalind Chichester. 
Slade inherited his baronetcy from his father in 1962, and is usually known as Sir Ben Slade. His older brother, Robert, predeceased their father. Sir Ben was educated at Millfield School.
He lives at Maunsel House in Bridgwater, Somerset. Slade is childless and has said he is looking for a male heir who has genetic similarity to one of his further paternal ancestors, who will take an interest in running the estate and to whom he will leave it in trust.

He was married (from the late 1970s to 1991) to Pauline Myburgh (daughter of Major Claude Myburgh) and divorced, claiming that her 17 cats were an impediment to the marriage. He had a relationship with Fiona Aitken (currently wife of the Earl of Carnarvon) for a few years in the 1990s. His partner was Kirsten Hughes, star of Jane and the Lost City, until she "ran off with the handyman". Slade was later accused by a neighbour of having abused Hughes; however, Slade successfully sued for libel, and the neighbour admitted to fabricating the allegations in an attempt to sabotage Slade's planned music festival.

In 2017 Slade separated from partner Bridget Convey because at the age of 50 she was too old to supply him with an heir. In the same year he advertised for a wife citing that she should have a shotgun licence, a driving licence, a coat of arms and be young enough to have sons. He rejected candidates from countries beginning with an 'I' or with green in the flag (except Italian and northern Indian women), Scots, lesbians and communists.

Sir Benjamin has starred in The Guest Wing, a television programme about owners of country houses, which was shown on Sky Atlantic in April 2012. In 2019 the television show 'Bring in the Sherriffs' called to take goods of several thousands of pounds. The outstanding bill was paid before goods were taken and the sheriffs left.

In 2019 Sir Benjamin was found by an employment tribunal to have unfairly dismissed and egregiously discriminated against two women who worked for him and who both became pregnant within a few months of each other. They were awarded compensation for unfair dismissal, lost earnings and discrimination totalling £179,500.

Since 2021, Sir Benjamin has been in a relationship with Rebekah Seddon-Wickens.

References 

1946 births
Baronets in the Baronetage of the United Kingdom
Living people
People educated at Millfield